Kerala State Lotteries is a lottery programme run by the Government of Kerala. Established in 1967, under the lottery department of the Government of Kerala, it is the first of its kind in India.

In 1967 all private lotteries were banned and the Government of Kerala started the Kerala State Lotteries. The idea behind the setup of the new department was from the then Finance Minister of the state, P. K. Kunju. He had earlier experience of conducting lottery when he was the chairman of Kayamkulam MSM Trust. The objectives of starting the programme were to provide employment to people and supplement government finance without disturbing the public.

The department soon became a model for other states in India. Soon many other states jumped into the bandwagon by starting their own lotteries.

As of 2021, the department now has more than 500 employees under its Directorate located at Vikas Bhavan at Thiruvananthapuram, 14 District Offices, 21 sub lottery offices and a Regional Deputy Directorate at Ernakulam. There is also an office of Regional Deputy Director for Audit in Kozhikodu. The department which was initially under the Department of Finance was later brought under the Taxes Department.

The Kerala State Lotteries include seven weekly lotteries in a week, a monthly draw each month and 6 Bumper Lotteries in a year.

Types of weekly Kerala Lotteries 
There are seven weekly lotteries conducted by the Kerala State Lottery Department now. The draw is conducted at 3:00 PM every day at Gorky Bhavan, Near Bakery Junction, Thiruvananthapuram.

In addition to the weekly lotteries listed above, Kerala State runs several seasonal 'bumper' lotteries: Xmas, Summer, Vishu, Monsoon, Thiruvonam and Pooja.

Publishing of results 
Kerala lottery draws for each weekly lottery are conducted at 3.00 pm on the draw date. The lottery department publishes the lottery draw result on the official website of Kerala lotteries on the same day. The Kerala lottery results are also published in the Kerala Government Gazette. The prize winners would have to verify the winning numbers with the result published in the Gazette and surrender the lottery ticket within 30 days of the draw date.

Benefits of the lottery 
There are several benefits connected to the Kerala State Lottery. The GST received from the sale of lottery tickets has helped support several welfare schemes in Kerala.

One of these is the Karunya scheme that provides financial support to citizens of the state that can not afford their medical bills. Since its inception it has helped more than 27,000 citizens. The scheme focuses primarily on providing financial assistance to the poor people of Kerala suffering from serious ailments like Cancer, Haemophilia, Kidney and Heart diseases and for Palliative Care. Hundreds of families come above the poverty line every month through the Kerala Lottery. Thousands of people wait to see the results every day at 3 pm with the hope that they will win a lottery worth crores.

References 

Government finances in Kerala
State agencies of Kerala
Lotteries
Gambling in India
1967 establishments in Kerala
Organisations based in Thiruvananthapuram